Attenborough is an English surname derived from Attenborough, Nottinghamshire, or similar toponym. Notable people of the name include:
 Charlotte Attenborough (born 1959), British actress; daughter of Richard, sister of Michael and Jane
 David Attenborough (born 1926), English television executive, presenter and naturalist; brother of Richard and John
 Frederick Attenborough (1887–1973), English academic; father of Richard, David, and John
 Frederick T. Attenborough (born 1983), British media and communications academic
 Geoffrey Attenborough (born 1951), South Australian cricketer
 Jane Attenborough (1955–2004), English arts administrator and manager; daughter of Richard, sister of Michael and Charlotte
 John Attenborough (1928–2012), executive at Alfa Romeo and financial advisor; brother of Richard and David
 Michael Attenborough (born 1950), English theatre director; son of Richard, brother of Jane and Charlotte
 Richard Attenborough (1923–2014), English film actor, director and producer; brother of David and John
 Thomas Attenborough (1833–1907), English cricketer
 Tom Attenborough (born 1986), British theatre director; son of Michael, brother of Will
 Walter Attenborough (1850–1932), British politician
 Will Attenborough (born 1991), British actor; son of Michael, brother of Tom

English toponymic surnames
Surnames of English origin
Surnames of British Isles origin